The Amalis is a river of  Kėdainiai district municipality, Kaunas County, central Lithuania. It is a right tributary of the river Smilgaitis.

It starts in agriculture fields near Šmotiškiai village and flows mostly eastwards till meets the Smilgaitis in Grašva village.

The name Amalis is of uncertain etymology.

References
 LIETUVOS RESPUBLIKOS UPIŲ IR TVENKINIŲ KLASIFIKATORIUS (Republic of Lithuania- River and Pond Classifications).  Ministry of Environment (Lithuania). Accessed 2011-11-17.

Rivers of Lithuania
Kėdainiai District Municipality